Be/X-ray binaries (BeXRBs) are a class of high-mass X-ray binaries that consist of a Be star and a neutron star.  The neutron star is usually in a wide highly elliptical orbit around the Be star. The Be stellar wind forms a disk confined to a plane often different from the orbital plane of the neutron star. When the neutron star passes through the Be disk, it accretes a large mass of gas in a short time. As the gas falls onto the neutron star, a bright flare in hard X-rays is seen.

X Persei

X Persei is a binary system containing a γ Cassiopeiae variable and a pulsar.  It has a relatively long period and low eccentricity for this type of binary, which means the x-ray emission is persistent and not usually strongly variable.  Some strong x-ray flares have been observed, presumably related to changes in the accretion disc, but no correlations have been found with the strong optical variations.

LSI+61°303

LSI+61°303 is a possible example of a Be/X-ray binary star. It is a periodic, radio-emitting binary system that is also the gamma-ray source, CG135+01.  It is also a variable radio source characterized by periodic, non-thermal radio outbursts with a period of 26.496 d.  The 26.5 d period is attributed to the eccentric orbital motion of a compact object, possibly a neutron star, around a rapidly rotating B0 Ve star.  Photometric observations at optical and infrared wavelengths also show a 26.5 d modulation.  Although the mass of the compact object in the LS I +61 303 system is not known accurately, it is likely that it is too large to be a neutron star and so it is likely to be a black hole.

Of the 20 or so members of the Be/X-ray binary class, as of 1996, only X Persei and LSI+61°303 have X-ray outbursts of much higher luminosity and harder spectrum (kT ≈ 10–20 keV) vs. (kT ≤ 1 keV).  LSI+61°303 also shows strong radio outbursts, more similar to those of the "standard" short-period high-mass X-ray binaries such as SS 433, Cyg X-3 and Cir X-1.

RX J0209.6-7427
RX J0209.6-7427 is a Be/X-ray binary star located in the Magellanic Bridge. A couple of rare outbursts have been observed from this source hosting a neutron star. The last outburst was detected in 2019 after about 26 years. The accreting neutron star in this Be/X-ray binary system is an ultraluminous X-ray Pulsar (ULXP) making it the second closest ULXP and the first ULXP in our neighbouring Galaxy in the Magellanic Clouds.

References

Be X-ray binary
Be X-ray binary